The prōtoierakarios or prōtohierakarios  ("first falconer"), also prōthierakarios (πρωθιερακάριος), was a Byzantine court office and honorific title in the 13th–15th centuries.

History and functions
The office first appears in the 13th-century Empire of Nicaea, although it clearly had earlier antecedents. Hunting was a particular passion of Byzantine emperors, and falconry in became increasingly popular among the upper classes from the 11th century on, judged from the references in literary sources and the appearance of manuals on falconry. In the 14th century, Andronikos III Palaiologos is said to have maintained over a thousand hunting dogs and over a thousand falcons.  

In the Book of Offices written by pseudo-Kodinos in the middle of the 14th century, the post occupies the 48th place in the imperial hierarchy, between the logothetēs tou stratiōtikou and the logothetēs tōn agelōn. The French scholar Rodolphe Guilland suggested that it was closely associated with the prōtokynēgos ("first huntsman"), who was in the 41st place, and that holders of the former office were promoted to the latter. According to pseudo-Kodinos, his functions were to supervise the keepers of the falcons. As a sign of this he bore a left-hand gauntlet on his belt, decorated with gold braid and purple eagles. His uniform was otherwise typical of the mid-level courtiers: a gold-brocaded hat (skiadion), a plain silk kabbadion, and a skaranikon (domed hat) covered in golden and lemon-yellow silk and decorated with gold wire and images of the emperor in front and rear, respectively depicted enthroned and on horseback. The office could be held by more than one persons at the same time.

The lowly rank and obscure charge of the position means that its holders are not often attested in the sources.

List of known prōtoierakarioi

See also
 Medieval hunting
 Grand Falconer of France

References

Sources

 
 

Byzantine court titles
Greek words and phrases
History of hunting
Falconry
Lists of office-holders in the Byzantine Empire